KRFO may refer to:

 KRFO (AM), a radio station (1390 AM) licensed to Owatonna, Minnesota, United States
 KRFO-FM, a radio station (104.9 FM) licensed to Owatonna, Minnesota, United States